Glyceryl diacetate is a food additive with the E number E1517.
This diglyceride is more generally known as diacetin. It is the diester of glycerol and acetylating agents, such as acetic acid and acetic anhydride. It is a colorless, viscous and odorless liquid with a high boiling point.  Glycerol diaceate is typically a mixture of two isomers, 1,2-glyceryl diacetate and 1,3-glyceryl diacetate.

See also
 Glycerine acetate
 Triacetin

References

E-number additives
Acetate esters
Glycerol esters